Ilse Kristiina ('Tiina') Lillak (born 15 April 1961) is a Finnish former javelin thrower. She is the  1983 world champion and 1984 Olympic silver medalist. She also twice broke the world record, with throws of 72.40 metres in 1982 and 74.76 metres in 1983. The latter distance ranks third on the all-time list with the old javelin model.

Career
Lillak finished fourth in the 1982 European Athletics Championships, which were held in Athens. On July 29, 1982, she threw a new world record in Helsinki of 72.40 meters. The record lasted until September when Greek thrower Sofia Sakorafa reached 74.20 meters. The following year, Lillak again broke the world record, throwing 74.76 meters in Tampere on June 13. This distance remained a world record until June 1985, and also stood as a national record for Finland until 1999, when the javelin type was altered and the former records were wiped clean. Among female javelin throwers, only Petra Felke and Fatima Whitbread have ever thrown further. (The record with the current model is 72.28m).

At the 1983 World Championships in Athletics held in Helsinki, Lillak became the champion in front of her home crowd when she threw for 70.82 meters on her last attempt leaving Britain's second placed Fatima Whitbread in tears at track side as she went running off down the track celebrating with the ecstatic crowd.

Although Lillak had only taken part in three competitions earlier in the year, she still managed to earn an Olympic silver medal at the 1984 Summer Olympics in Los Angeles, California. Medals did not materialise at the 1986 European Athletics Championships (fourth) or the 1987 World Championships in Athletics (sixth).

She failed in an attempt to reach the Olympic podium a second time at the 1988 Seoul Olympics, where Lillak did not pass the qualifying round. She participated in five competitions in 1989, but no major events. In 1990 she won the last of her seven Finnish national championships and came tenth in the 1990 European Athletics Championships. In the 1991 World Championships in Athletics, Lillak did not pass the qualifying round (in fact, she did not throw over 62 meters the entire season).

Since retiring from athletics in 1992, Lillak has been working as masseuse.

International competitions

References

 Lillak at the sporting-heroes.net site
 All of Lillak's competition results
 Last and winning throw in 1983 World Championships in Helsinki (video)

1961 births
Living people
Athletes from Helsinki
Finnish female javelin throwers
Olympic athletes of Finland
Athletes (track and field) at the 1980 Summer Olympics
Athletes (track and field) at the 1984 Summer Olympics
Athletes (track and field) at the 1988 Summer Olympics
Olympic silver medalists for Finland
World Athletics Championships medalists
World Athletics Championships athletes for Finland
Medalists at the 1984 Summer Olympics
Olympic silver medalists in athletics (track and field)
World Athletics Championships winners